The 1930 Georgia Bulldogs football team represented the Georgia Bulldogs of the University of Georgia during the 1930 college football season. The Bulldogs completed the season with a 7–2–1 record.

Schedule

Players

Line

Backfield

Unlisted

References

Georgia
Georgia Bulldogs football seasons
Georgia Bulldogs football